Douglas Allan Ford (16 December 1928 – 30 June 2019) was an Australian cricketer. He played 65 first-class matches for New South Wales between 1957/58 and 1963/64.

See also
 List of New South Wales representative cricketers

References

1928 births
2019 deaths
Australian cricketers
New South Wales cricketers
Cricketers from Newcastle, New South Wales